Judit Csabai (born 5 March 1973 in Nyíregyháza) is a former freestyle swimmer from Hungary, who competed at the Summer Olympics for her native country in 1988.

At the European Championships she won a bronze medal in 1987 in 800 metre freestyle.

References

1973 births
Living people
Olympic swimmers of Hungary
Hungarian female freestyle swimmers
Swimmers at the 1988 Summer Olympics
People from Nyíregyháza
European Aquatics Championships medalists in swimming
Sportspeople from Szabolcs-Szatmár-Bereg County
20th-century Hungarian women
21st-century Hungarian women